James Vernon may refer to:
James Vernon (1646–1727), English politician
James Vernon the Younger (1677–1756), British diplomat, civil servant, and briefly a Member of Parliament
James Vernon (chemist) (1910–2000), Australian industrial chemist, Director of CSR (Colonial Sugar Refining Company) 1958–82
James Vernon (historian), late 20th century British historian
Jim Vernon, Scottish footballer